Hawkman is the name of several superheroes appearing in American comic books published by DC Comics. Created by writer Gardner Fox and artist Dennis Neville, the original Hawkman first appeared in Flash Comics #1, published by All-American Publications in 1940.

Several incarnations of Hawkman have appeared in DC Comics, all of them characterized by the use of archaic weaponry and by large, artificial wings, attached to a harness made from the special Nth metal that allows flight. Most incarnations of Hawkman work closely with a partner/romantic interest named Hawkgirl or Hawkwoman.

Hawkman is most often depicted as human archaeologist Carter Hall—the modern-day reincarnation of an ancient Egyptian prince named Khufu—or as Thanagarian police officer Katar Hol from the planet Thanagar. The character is generally regarded as having one of the most confusing backstories of any in DC Comics, due to a series of reinventions over the years following DC's 1985 series Crisis on Infinite Earths. Some writers have attempted to integrate Carter Hall and Katar Hol into one story by linking the Thanagarian aliens to the Egyptian curse that causes Hawkman to reincarnate periodically throughout human history, or by using Carter Hall as Katar Hol's alias, or otherwise depicting the merger of Carter and Katar into one being.

The character has been adapted into other media numerous times, with significant appearances in the animated Justice League Unlimited cartoon, which featured Hawkgirl as a main character, as well as several DC Universe Original Animated Movies.

In live action, the character first appeared onscreen in the two-part 1979 TV special Legends of the Superheroes by Bill Nuckols appearing alongside Adam West and Burt Ward as allies Batman and Robin. Hawkman was later portrayed by Michael Shanks in Smallville and by Falk Hentschel in The CW's Arrowverse family of shows, with both versions favoring the ancient Egyptian version of the character. Hawkman made his cinematic debut and portrayed by Aldis Hodge in 2022's Black Adam set in the DC Extended Universe.

Publication history
Hawkman first appeared in Flash Comics #1 (1940), and was a featured character in that title throughout the 1940s. This Hawkman was Carter Hall, a reincarnation of the ancient Egyptian prince Khufu. Hall discovered that the mysterious "ninth metal" (later changed simply to "Nth metal") could negate the effects of gravity and allow him to fly. He donned a costume with large wings to allow him to control his flight and became the crimefighter, Hawkman. He also had a companion hawk named Big Red that assisted him in fighting crime. An archaeologist by profession, Hall used ancient weapons from the museum that he curated.

Hawkman was a charter member of the Justice Society of America, beginning with All Star Comics #3 (Winter 1940). In issue #8 he became the JSA's chairman, a position he held until the end of the JSA's run in All Star Comics in 1951. He was the only member of the JSA to appear in every adventure during the Golden Age of Comic Books. He romanced his reincarnated bride, Shiera Saunders, who became the crimefighter Hawkgirl. His first three adventures were drawn by creator Dennis Neville (who modeled Hawkman's costume on the hawkmen characters in the Flash Gordon comic strip by Alex Raymond), then by Sheldon Moldoff, and later by Joe Kubert, who slightly redesigned his mask in Flash Comics # 85 (Jul 1947) and then, one year later, replaced the winged-hawk-like mask with a much simpler yellow cowl in Flash Comics #98 (Aug 1948).

Along with most other superheroes, Hawkman's Golden Age adventures came to an end when the industry turned away from the genre in the early 1950s. His last appearance was in All Star Comics #57 (1951).

Later in the decade, DC Comics, under editor Julius Schwartz, decided to revive a number of heroes in new incarnations, but retaining the same names and powers. Following the success of the Flash and Green Lantern, the name "Hawkman" was revived in The Brave and the Bold # 34 (Feb–Mar 1961), this time as an alien police officer from the planet Thanagar, though his powers were largely the same. Created by Gardner Fox and Joe Kubert, this Hawkman named Katar Hol came to Earth with his wife Shayera in pursuit of a criminal, and decided to remain on Earth to study earth police methods as well as fight crime. They adopted the names Carter and Shiera Hall and became curators of a museum in Midway City.

This Hawkman became a member of the Justice League of America in issue #31, where he often verbally sparred with the iconoclastic liberal hero Green Arrow. In the 1960s, it was revealed that the original Hawkman lived on the parallel world of Earth-Two, and that Katar Hol lived on Earth-One. The JLA and JSA had an annual meeting throughout the 1960s and 1970s during which the two heroes often met.

The Silver Age Hawkman had his own series for a few years in the '60s, but with declining sales it ended at issue #27 and was then merged with that of the Atom. Atom and Hawkman lasted only another year or so before cancellation.

In the late 1970s in Showcase and World's Finest Comics, Thanagar went to war with the planet Rann, the adopted home of Adam Strange. This led to Hawkman and Hawkwoman severing ties with their homeworld, and later fighting The Shadow War of Hawkman (written by Tony Isabella) as the Thanagarians tried secretly to conquer the Earth.

The landmark 1985 series Crisis on Infinite Earths resulted in a massive revision of much of DC continuity and led to many characters being substantially rewritten. Hawkman was to suffer some of the greatest confusion as successive writers sought to explain his various appearances. In the revised timeline there was a single Earth which had witnessed the JSA in the 1940s and the JLA decades later. Successive revisions sought to establish exactly who had been Hawkman and Hawkwoman at different stages. For the first few years the pre-Crisis incarnations were still used, during which time they were prominent across the DC Universe and joined the latest incarnation of the Justice League.

DC decided to reboot Hawkman, in a limited series (which later led to an ongoing series) titled Hawkworld originally by Tim Truman, and later John Ostrander. In this series, Thanagar was a stratified society which conquered other worlds to enrich itself. Katar Hol was the son of a prominent official who rebelled against the status quo. He and his partner Shayera were sent to Earth and remained there for some years until Hol was apparently killed.

This created several continuity errors. Because the new Katar Hol had only just arrived on Earth, someone else had to have been Hawkman previously. In an attempt to resolve the problem it was established through retcons that the Golden Age Hawkman and Hawkgirl had continued to operate sporadically after their supposed retirement in 1951 through the 1990s, and that Nth metal originally came from Thanagar. The Halls, and not the Hols, joined the original incarnation of the JLA. Another Hawkman—Fel Andar, a Thanagarian agent—had been the one who joined the Justice League during the 1980s, pretending to be a hero but secretly spying on the League for his Thanagarian masters.

The Zero Hour miniseries muddied the waters further by merging the different Hawkmen into a "Hawkgod", who was the focus character in the third volume of the monthly Hawkman series. This version of Hawkman also had a small role in the alternate-future series Kingdom Come. After the end of this series, Hawkman's continuity was considered by DC to be too complicated, and he was absent from comics for several years.

In the late 1990s, the JSA series untangled Hawkman's continuity, establishing him as Carter Hall, a man who—along with Shiera—had been reincarnated dozens of times since his life in ancient Egypt, and whose powers were derived from Thanagarian Nth metal, which had been retroactively renamed from "ninth metal". The Katar Hol of the Hawkworld series had also come to Earth during the 1990s, as previously established. The 1980s Hawkman Fel Andar returned to Thanagar. The Hawkgod was later revealed to be an avatar of the Hawk aspect of the Red (from which Animal Man receives his powers) and only believed that he was Hawkman.

During the Identity Crisis miniseries, it was established that Hawkman (Carter Hall) had encouraged the mindwipe of Doctor Light and had actually been the one to initially suggest the idea. His role in the mindwipe was the basis for his enmity with Green Arrow, who felt that interfering with an individual's right to self-determination was beyond the moral right of any organization or government.

Subsequently, Hawkman was reincarnated and given a new series in 2002 entitled Hawkman vol. 4, written initially by James Robinson and Geoff Johns, with art by Rags Morales. Justin Gray and Jimmy Palmiotti took over writing duties during the third year of the series. In 2006, the series was retitled Hawkgirl with issue #50 and given a new creative team of Walt Simonson and Howard Chaykin. This series was cancelled with issue #66 in July 2007.

Hawkman was a major character in the Rann–Thanagar War miniseries, which stemmed from events in Countdown to Infinite Crisis. During this time his continuity was further changed (see Carter Hall section below).

The character then received a new series spinning out of Dark Nights: Metal, helmed by Robert Venditti and Bryan Hitch.

Fictional character biographies

Carter Hall

In the days of ancient Egypt, Prince Khufu is engaged in a feud with his rival, the Egyptian priest Hath-Set. The priest eventually captures both Khufu and his consort Chay-Ara, and kills them using a cursed dagger of Nth metal. Millennia later, in 1940, Khufu is reincarnated as American archaeologist Carter Hall, Chay-Ara as Shiera Saunders, and Hath-Set as scientist Anton Hastor. After touching the same Nth Metal dagger used to kill Khufu, Carter regains the memories of his former life and realizes Hastor is the reincarnation of his ancient foe. When Hastor kidnaps Shiera, using a magic spell to draw her to his lair, Hall uses his newly-refound memories to craft a gravity-defying belt using Nth metal and a winged costume to become Hawkman. Carter successfully rescues Shiera, Anton is killed by electrocution, and Carter and Saunders begin a romantic relationship.

Carter Hall and Shiera Saunders had a son together, named Hector Hall, who grew up to also have a superheroic identity as Silver Scarab and later adopted the mantle of Dr. Fate. Hector Hall was a member of the superhero groups Infinity Inc. and the JSA, where he served alongside his father.

Katar Hol

Katar Hol is an honored police officer on his homeworld of Thanagar. Along with his wife Shayera, they use the anti-gravity belts and their wings to fly and fight criminals. These were the tools of an elite police unit tasked to track and apprehend the most dangerous criminals. The pair were sent to Earth in 1961 to capture the shape-shifting criminal Byth. Following this mission, they elected to remain on Earth to work with authorities in the United States and learn human police methods. The two adopted covers as a pair of museum curators, Carter and Shiera Hall, and acted publicly as the second Hawkman and the second Hawkgirl (later Hawkwoman).

Although initially depicted as surviving the Crisis on Infinite Earths intact, Katar Hol was rebooted just a few years afterwards in a prestige-format miniseries named Hawkworld, by Timothy Truman. A regular ongoing series of the same name followed, with writer John Ostrander joining Truman. Katar Hol, a young police officer on the planet Thanagar, rebels against the oppressive system of his planet and is sent into exile. He later escapes and uncovers a renegade police captain Byth. As a result, he is reinstated into the force, given a new partner, Shayera Thal, and sent on a mission on Earth, where he is the third Hawkman.

In DC's The New 52 universe, Hawkman is Katar Hol but uses the name Carter Hall.

Fel Andar

Late in the 1980s, Thanagarian spy Fel Andar—who had been living on Earth for some time already—fell in love with an Earth woman, Sharon Parker, and they had a son named Charley. Andar was ordered by the Thanagarian government to infiltrate the Justice League and Parker's memories were altered so that she believed she was Hawkwoman and believed that her son was "Carter Hall Jr." instead of Andar's son. Charley Andar later took up the name Hawkman to honor his "father" whom he believed to be Carter Hall. When Parker's old memories surface, she exposed Andar's infiltration plot; Andar murdered her and fled to Thanagar. Andar later returned to Earth to help his son become the hero known as Golden Eagle, and saved his life once before being recaptured and returned to Thanagar.

Zauriel

When Grant Morrison revived the JLA comic book in 1997, they expanded the roster to include over a dozen heroes. With frequent collaborator Mark Millar, they intended to create a new Hawkman with no links to the old characters. This new Hawkman, an Earth-bound angel of the "Eagle host" named Zauriel, was to be introduced into the JLA with issue #6 (June 1997). Morrison was denied permission to use the name "Hawkman" by DC editorial, which still considered it "radioactive", due to the complex post-Crisis continuity problems with the character.

In the Wizard JLA Special, Morrison made an appeal to the fanbase, "It's a good name and it seems a shame to let it go to waste. We're hoping that fans will figure 'For God's sake, let's just call him Hawkman and get him in the Justice League as Hawkman,' and the editors will relent. We're hoping to start a campaign." DC held firm, and the "Hawkman" name went unused for several more years.

Charley Parker

Originally the Teen Titans member called Golden Eagle, Charley Parker was presumed deceased after an attack by the Wildebeest Society during the event known as Titans Hunt. He was later revealed to be alive in the fourth volume of Hawkman and went on to assist the Carter Hall Hawkman for some time. When Carter Hall seemingly perished, Charley Parker took on the mantle and became the fourth Hawkman, and revealed himself as the son of Carter Hall. In fact, he was actually the son of Fel Andar, and had been responsible for Carter's troubles and his apparent demise. Carter Hall eventually defeated the Golden Eagle, their vendetta was later dropped, and Carter Hall reclaimed his mantle.

Powers and abilities
All incarnations of Hawkman used the fictional "enth metal" or "Nth metal" to defy gravity and allow them to fly. The metal is in their costume's belt, boots, and wings. Its abilities are controlled mentally. Their wings allow them to control their flight, though they can be "flapped" through use of shoulder motions. In most comic books, Hawkman is known to have slightly enhanced physical strength.

The Golden Age Hawkman was also granted the ability to breathe underwater by the sea god Poseidon. He also discovered a hidden kingdom of sentient birds led by the old One-Eye, who taught him their language and later sacrificed himself to save Hawkman's life. Among the leading birds was a hawk named Big Red who became a companion and even helped the Golden Age Hawkman solve crimes.

The Silver Age Hawkman also had enhanced senses comparable to a hawk's. He, and sometimes the Golden Age Hawkman as well, were also able to converse with birds, though they could not command them in the same way that, say, Aquaman could command sea creatures. Hawkman also wore special contact lenses that allowed him to detect beams and radiation.

The Silver Age Hawkman also possessed a Thanagarian police space ship and a variety of science fiction weapons.

All versions of Hawkman prefer to use archaic weaponry—particularly maces, nets, spears, and shields—rather than modern or futuristic weapons. The current incarnation prefers this in part because, having the memories of having lived through many past lives, he is more proficient in their use than with contemporary weapons. In Katar Hol's case, it was too dangerous to use Thanagarian weaponry since there was too great a chance they could be lost or captured and then used or duplicated on Earth. There is, however, one significantly unique weapon Carter employs occasionally: the Claw of Horus. Constructed of Nth metal by Prince Khufu in ancient Egypt, it was delivered to the newly resurrected Carter Hall by the time-displaced Jay Garrick in JSA Book 3: "The Return of Hawkman". Later, in Superman-Batman Book 1: "Public Enemies", Hawkman used it to defeat Superman, using its Nth metal to channel the Earth's gravitational field. As he explained to Superman, "Essentially, I just hit you with the planet."

All versions of Hawkman have shown enhanced levels of strength. The Golden Age Hawkman was said to have the strength of 12 men but later that idea was dropped. Where as the Golden Age Hawkman's strength appeared natural, it was later explained (with the 
Silver Age Hawkman) that the Nth metal enables its wielders to carry great weights. The recent incarnation has interpreted this as the Nth metal simply enhancing the strength of the user. Also, several JLA and JSA stories indicate that Thanagar has greater gravity than Earth, and that Thanagarians are naturally stronger than humans because they are adapted to it, similarly to how Atlanteans (e.g. Aquaman) are adapted to deep sea pressures.

It has also been explained in the JSA series that the Nth metal greatly aids in healing, closing wounds almost instantaneously. One example is in the JLA story "Crisis of Conscience", in issues 115–118, when Carter's arm is nearly severed during one part of the issue, but the wound has obviously closed and functionality returned by the end of the issue. The Atom has commented that Hawkman laughs at anything less than third-degree burns.

The Nth metal also regulates the body temperature of the wearer, preventing the need for heavy protective clothing while in high altitudes. It also has the property of radiating heat, which can be controlled to warm the wearer in colder climates.

Other versions
 During the chronal disruptions of Zero Hour, multiple versions of Hawkman (and Hawkgirl/Hawkwoman) from alternate timelines were appearing in and out of existence. It turns out the Hawks were one of many anomalies in the timestream resulting from the Crisis. Somehow the various versions were converged into the current reality's Katar Hol.
 A Hawkman evolved from Robin in the Just Imagine... comic book. This version was a humanoid hawk, similar to Northwind.
 Hawkman's Anti-matter Earth counterpart is Blood Eagle. He was killed by the Crime Syndicate. It is unclear whether he is a Thanagarian (like Katar Hol) or a human (like Carter Hall).

Awards
The series and character have won several awards over the years, including:
 1961 Alley Award for Best Adventure Hero/Heroine Not in Own Book
 1962 Alley Award for Best Hero
 1963 Alley Award for Cross-Over of DC Heroes (The Brave and the Bold with the Flash)

Reception
Hawkman was ranked as the 118th-greatest comic book character of all time by Wizard magazine. IGN also ranked Hawkman as the 56th-greatest comic book hero of all time, stating that the best part of Hawkman is his incredibly short fuse. IGN also described him as a complete and total badass.

Collected editions

Carter Hall

Kator Hol

In other media

Television

Animation
 The Katar Hol incarnation of Hawkman appears in The Superman/Aquaman Hour of Adventure, voiced by Vic Perrin.
 The Katar Hol incarnation of Hawkman appears in Super Friends, voiced by Jack Angel. This version is a member of the titular team.
 Two characters based on Hawkman appear in media set in the DC Animated Universe:
 A character loosely based on the Katar Hol incarnation of Hawkman called Hro Talak appears in the Justice League three-part episode "Starcrossed", voiced by Victor Rivers.
 A character based on the Carter Hall incarnation of Hawkman with elements of Katar Hol appears in Justice League Unlimited, voiced by James Remar.
 The Katar Hol incarnation of Hawkman appears in The Batman, voiced by Robert Patrick.
 The Carter Hall incarnation of Hawkman appears in the Batman: The Brave and the Bold episode "The Golden Age of Justice!", voiced by William Katt.
 Hawkman appears in DC Super Friends: The Joker's Playhouse, voiced by David Kaye. This version is a member of the Super Friends.
 The Katar Hol incarnation of Hawkman appears in Young Justice, voiced by James Arnold Taylor. This version is a member of the Justice League.
 An unidentified Hawkman appears in the Mad segment "That's What Super Friends Are For".
 The Katar Hol incarnation of Hawkman appears in Justice League Action, voiced by Troy Baker.
 The Carter Hall incarnation of Hawkman appears in DC Super Hero Girls, voiced by Phil LaMarr.
 Comic artist/writer Jack Kirby produced concept art for a planned Hawkman animated series.
 An unidentified Hawkman makes a cameo appearance in "Harley Quinn: A Very Problematic Valentine’s Day Special", voiced by Tyler James Williams. This version is African-American.

Live-action
 The Katar Hol incarnation of Hawkman appears in Legends of the Superheroes, portrayed by Bill Nuckols.
 The Carter Hall incarnation of Hawkman appears in Smallville, portrayed by Michael Shanks. This version is a member of the Justice Society of America.
 The Carter Hall incarnation of Hawkman appears in media set in the Arrowverse, portrayed by Falk Hentschel.
 The Carter Hall incarnation of Hawkman appears in Stargirl as a member of the Justice Society of America.

Film
 The Carter Hall and Katar Hol incarnations of Hawkman make cameo appearances in Justice League: The New Frontier. The former is a member of the Justice Society while the latter is a member of the Justice League.
 The Katar Hol incarnation of Hawkman appears in Superman/Batman: Public Enemies, voiced by an uncredited Michael Gough.
 An alternate universe version of Hawkman called ManHawk makes a cameo appearance in Justice League: Crisis on Two Earths as a minor member of the Crime Syndicate.
 Hawkman appears in Lego DC Comics Super Heroes: Justice League vs. Bizarro League, voiced by Phil Morris.
 A Hawkman film was in development by Warner Bros. in the early 2010s, but nothing came of it.
 Hawkman makes minor non-speaking appearances in the DC Animated Movie Universe (DCAMU) films Justice League Dark, The Death of Superman, and Justice League Dark: Apokolips War. This version is a member of the Justice League.
 A variation of Carter Hall / Hawkman appears in Justice Society: World War II. This version hails from Earth-2 and is a founding member of Justice Society of America.
 The Carter Hall incarnation of Hawkman appears in Teen Titans Go! & DC Super Hero Girls: Mayhem in the Multiverse, voiced again by Phil LaMarr.
 The Carter Hall incarnation of Hawkman appears in Black Adam, portrayed by Aldis Hodge. This version is the leader of the Justice Society of America.

Video games
 The Carter Hall incarnation of Hawkman appears as a playable character in Batman: The Brave and the Bold – The Videogame, voiced again by William Katt.
 The Carter Hall incarnation of Hawkman appears as an assist character in Scribblenauts Unmasked: A DC Comics Adventure.
 The Carter Hall incarnation of Hawkman appears as a non-playable character in DC Universe Online, voiced by Jason Liebrecht.
 The Carter Hall incarnation of Hawkman appears as a playable character in Lego Batman 2: DC Super Heroes, voiced by Troy Baker.
 The Carter Hall incarnation of Hawkman appears as a support card in the mobile version of Injustice: Gods Among Us.
 The Carter Hall incarnation of Hawkman appears as a playable character in Lego Batman 3: Beyond Gotham, voiced by Travis Willingham.
 An unidentified Hawkman appears as a playable character in Lego DC Super-Villains, voiced again by Travis Willingham.

See also
 Birdman and the Galaxy Trio – 1967 TV cartoon series with a similar character

References

External links
 
 History of Hawkman on Sequart
 Everything You Never Wanted To Know About Hawkman
 Hawkman Timeline 
 Hawkfan – A fansite dedicated to Hawkman and Hawkgirl. Not to be confused with the Hawkwind fanzine.
 Hawkworld: Still Goin' Strong!
 Comics 101 – Hawkman: Winging It PART I, PART II, and PART III

 
Articles about multiple fictional characters
Comics characters introduced in 1940
DC Comics American superheroes
DC Comics characters with superhuman strength
DC Comics characters with accelerated healing
DC Comics extraterrestrial superheroes
DC Comics male superheroes
Characters created by Dennis Neville
Egyptian superheroes
Egyptian mythology in comics
Fictional characters with death or rebirth abilities
Fictional characters with immortality
Fiction about reincarnation
1964 comics debuts